Mămăligă în pături (layered mămăligă, literally "mămăligă in blankets") is a traditional dish from the Maramureș region, in the north of Romania. The dish is made up of many layers of mămăligă alternating with layers of sour cream (smântână), butter, cheese and eggs like a mille-feuille.

See also 
 Bulz
 Cocoloşi
 List of maize dishes
 Tochitură

Notes and references 

Romanian dishes
Maize dishes